Edwin M. Stanton School may refer to:

Edwin M. Stanton School (Jacksonville), National Register of Historic Places listings in Duval County, Florida
Edwin M. Stanton School (Philadelphia), National Register of Historic Places listings in Philadelphia County, Pennsylvania

See also
Stanton College Preparatory School, modern successor to Jacksonville's Edwin M. Stanton School